SVG or Scalable Vector Graphics is a vector image format for two-dimensional computer graphics.

SVG may also refer to:
 SVG Air, an airline from Saint Vincent and the Grenadines
 SVG Capital, UK
 Saint Vincent and the Grenadines, a Caribbean nation
 Shane van Gisbergen, a New Zealand racing driver
 Stevenage railway station in England
 Sun Valley Gardens, a nudist club in Pelham, Ontario, Canada
 The IATA code for Stavanger Airport, Sola in Norway